Energy–maneuverability theory is a model of aircraft performance. It was developed by Col. John Boyd, a fighter pilot, and Thomas P. Christie, a mathematician with the United States Air Force, and is useful in describing an aircraft's performance as the total of kinetic and potential energies or aircraft specific energy. It relates the thrust, weight, aerodynamic drag, wing area, and other flight characteristics of an aircraft into a quantitative model. This allows combat capabilities of various aircraft or prospective design trade-offs to be predicted and compared.

Formula 
All of these aspects of airplane performance are compressed into a single value by the following formula:

History 
John Boyd, a U.S. jet fighter pilot in the Korean War, began developing the theory in the early 1960s. He teamed with mathematician Thomas Christie at Eglin Air Force Base to use the base's high-speed computer to compare the performance envelopes of U.S. and Soviet aircraft from the Korean and Vietnam Wars. They completed a two-volume report on their studies in 1964.  Energy Maneuverability came to be accepted within the U.S. Air Force and brought about improvements in the requirements for the F-15 Eagle and later the F-16 Fighting Falcon fighters.

See also 
 Lagrangian mechanics

Notes

References

Hammond, Grant T. The Mind of War: John Boyd and American Security.
Coram, Robert. Boyd: The Fighter Pilot Who Changed the Art of War.
Wendl, M.J., G.G. Grose, J.L. Porter, and V.R. Pruitt. Flight/Propulsion Control Integration Aspects of Energy Management. Society of Automotive Engineers, 1974, p. 740480.

Aerospace engineering